Meybod ( is a city in the Central District of Meybod County, Yazd province, Iran, and serves as capital of the county. At the 2006 census, its population was 58,295 in 15,703 households. The following census in 2011 counted 66,907 people in 19,153 households. The latest census in 2016 showed a population of 80,712 people in 23,986 households.

Meybod is a major desert city in Yazd province, Iran, and the second major city in Yazd.

History 
It is an ancient city that goes back to the pre-Islamic era and, hence, is the home to many ancient points of interests. The Historical City of Maybod is part of the Tentative List, in order to qualify for inclusion in the World Heritage List.

It was the capital of Iran during the period of the Mozaffarids. The Mozaffarid kingdom originated from Meybod where the first king, Mubariz al-Din Muhammad, was born. One of the oldest castles in Iran is Narin ghaleh in Meybod, which dates back to the Achaemenid and Sassanid periods. Chaparkhaneh and Karvansaraye Abbasi are some other examples of the historical buildings from Safavid era. The town was sacked and massacred by the Mongols and later the Timurids, however it recovered under the Safavids.

Many important major poets, Sufis, clergymen and politicians came from Meybod. Meybodi, the author of "Kashf-ol-Asrar", Grand Ayatollah Haeri, Hossein Makki and many others lived in Maybod, to name a few.

Unfortunately, some of its historical points were demolished by local authorities who did not understand the archeological values. Yet, it hosts many tourists from every corner of the world every day.

Attractions 
Narenj (Narin) Castle This building, which in colloquial language is called Narenj Castle, is one of the most important relics of the province dating back to the period before the advent of Islam to Iran, and has been recorded as one of the national buildings. This ancient castle has been constructed on the top of Galeen hill and overlooks the city. It seems that upper floors of the building have been reconstructed and belong to the Islamic era. It may have been constructed during the period of the Mozaffarids or the Safavids. A section of the building was destroyed in the course of road construction during the reign of Reza Shah Pahlavi.

University of Meybod 
Maybod University was established in 1995. Maybod University has courses and programs for bachelor's, master's, doctorate in several fields of study. This 27-year-old Iranian institution of higher education has a selective admission policy based on entrance exams and academic records and past grades of students. International students can apply for registration. It also offers students scholarships, study abroad and exchange programs, online courses and distance learning opportunities, as well as administrative services.

Gallery

External links 
 Farshid Sāmāni, Meybod, A Museum of the Living (in Persian), Jadid Online, 9 April 2010, .Audio slideshow:  (5 min 12 sec).

References 

Meybod County

Cities in Yazd Province

Populated places in Yazd Province

Populated places in Meybod County